Smakayevo is a microdistrict in the town of Ishimbay, Republic of Bashkortostan, Russia, located on the banks of the stream (formerly a small river) Buzaygyr, a tributary of the Tayruk River.

Since 1795, Smakayevo has been known as a village of the Bashkir tribe Yurmaty. The village formerly contained 18 houses and 85 people.

Population

References

Ishimbay